The 2014–15 Polish Cup was the 58th edition of the Polish Volleyball Cup tournament.

Lotos Trefl Gdańsk won their first Polish Cup in club history after beating Asseco Resovia in the final (3–1).

Final four
 Venue: Ergo Arena, Gdańsk/Sopot 
 All times are Central European Summer Time (UTC+02:00).

Semifinals
|}

Final

|}

Final standings

Awards

Most Valuable Player	
  Mateusz Mika (Lotos Trefl Gdańsk)
Best Server
  Murphy Troy (Lotos Trefl Gdańsk)
Best Receiver	
  Piotr Gacek (Lotos Trefl Gdańsk)
Best Defender
  Krzysztof Ignaczak (Asseco Resovia)
	
Best Blocker	
  Piotr Nowakowski (Asseco Resovia)
Best Opposite Spiker
  Jochen Schöps (Asseco Resovia)
Best Setter
  Fabian Drzyzga (Asseco Resovia)

See also
 2014–15 PlusLiga

References

External links
 Official website

Polish Cup
Polish Cup
Polish Cup
Polish Cup